Fairfield County Airport  is a public airport located three miles (5 km) southwest of the central business district of Winnsboro, in Fairfield County, South Carolina, United States. It is owned by Fairfield County.

Although most U.S. airports use the same three-letter location identifier for the FAA and IATA, Fairfield County Airport is assigned FDW by the FAA but has no designation from the IATA.

Facilities and aircraft 

For the 12-month period ending May 1, 2007, the airport had 17,000 aircraft operations, an average of 46 per day: 95% general aviation, 3% air taxi and 2% military. There are 30 aircraft based at this airport: 80% single engine and 20% multi-engine. By June 1, 2009 there will be 30 T-Hangars on base.

The on location fixed-base operator is S&S Aviation.

References

External links 

Airports in South Carolina
Buildings and structures in Fairfield County, South Carolina
Transportation in Fairfield County, South Carolina